Events from the year 1514 in Ireland.

Incumbent
Lord: Henry VIII

Events

Births
November 27 – Peter Carew, English adventurer in Ireland (b. 1514?)

Deaths

References

 
1510s in Ireland
Ireland
Years of the 16th century in Ireland